Sohansara is a village in the Bhiwani district of the Indian state of Haryana.

Village Panchayat

Village Sarpanch

Transport 
Sohansara railway station is on the Rewari – Mahendragarh – Satnali – Loharu – Sadulpur – Churu – Bikaner – Degana – Jodhpur broad gauge railway line. Local roads connect to Loharu, Satnali, Mahendergarh and Rewari.

Religious sites

Temple
 Baba Bhomiya Temple
 Nanu Shakti Temple
 Thakur Ji Jaal Wala Temple
 Hanuman Ji Temple
 Maa Shera Wali Temple
 Baba Sultan Natha Temple
 Baba Prakash Puri Ji Maharaj Temple
 Sedh Mata Mandir

Education

Government School
 Government Senior Secondary School 
 Government Girls Middle School
 Government Model Sanskarti Primary school

Private School
 M L M Senior Secondary School 
 SDM Middle School

References

External links
Genealogy of the Nawabs of Loharu Queensland University

Villages in Bhiwani district
Bhiwani